The Lacon Bridge crosses the Illinois River in the community of Lacon, Illinois. Built in 1939, it is one of the oldest crossings of the Illinois River.

Bridges completed in 1939
Buildings and structures in Marshall County, Illinois
Bridges over the Illinois River
Truss bridges in the United States
Metal bridges in the United States